In mathematical set theory, the Laver property holds between two models if they are not "too dissimilar", in the following sense.

A forcing notion is said to have the Laver property if and only if the forcing extension has the Laver property over the ground model.  Examples include Laver forcing.

The concept is named after Richard Laver.

Shelah proved that when proper forcings with the Laver property are iterated using countable supports, the resulting forcing notion will have the Laver property as well.

The conjunction of the Laver property and the -bounding property is equivalent to the Sacks property.

References

Forcing (mathematics)